Poplar Hills is a home rule-class city in Jefferson County, Kentucky, United States. It is a part of the Louisville Metro government, but operates as a city under the Mayor to Commissioner form of government. Per the 2020 census, the population was 380, but the city administration has made several annexation ordinances that have passed and awaits updated information. The current city population is estimated to be 2380. It currently has the highest population density for any city in Kentucky, and is the only Kentucky city that is on the highest population densities of American cities list.

Geography
Poplar Hills is located in central Jefferson County at  (38.176490, -85.693492). It is bordered to the northeast by Watterson Park and on all other sides by consolidated Louisville/Jefferson County. Kentucky Route 864 (Poplar Level Road) runs along the northeast border of the community.

Demographics

2020 census

Note: the US Census treats Hispanic/Latino as an ethnic category. This table excludes Latinos from the racial categories and assigns them to a separate category. Hispanics/Latinos can be of any race.

2000 Census
As of the census of 2000, there were 396 people, 234 households, and 77 families residing in the city. The racial makeup of the city was 40.15% White, 55.30% African American, 0.76% Asian, 1.52% from other races, and 2.27% from two or more races. Hispanic or Latino of any race were 2.27% of the population.

There were 234 households, out of which 15.0% had children under the age of 18 living with them, 15.4% were married couples living together, 12.8% had a female householder with no husband present, and 66.7% were non-families. 50.9% of all households were made up of individuals, and 3.0% had someone living alone who was 65 years of age or older. The average household size was 1.69 and the average family size was 2.36.

In the city, the population was spread out, with 14.4% under the age of 18, 20.7% from 18 to 24, 44.7% from 25 to 44, 17.4% from 45 to 64, and 2.8% who were 65 years of age or older. The median age was 28 years. For every 100 females, there were 85.9 males. For every 100 females age 18 and over, there were 85.2 males.

The median income for a household in the city was $26,964, and the median income for a family was $22,000. Males had a median income of $31,000 versus $22,083 for females. The per capita income for the city was $19,879. About 19.1% of families and 19.7% of the population were below the poverty line, including 31.9% of those under age 18 and 46.2% of those age 65 or over.

References

Cities in Jefferson County, Kentucky
Cities in Kentucky
Populated places established in 1983
1983 establishments in Kentucky